Solid Steel are a series of DJ mix albums issued on Ninja Tune, an independent record label in the UK.

Solid Steel also has a radio station webcast and related live concerts which further showcase the DJing talents of such artists.

In 1988, Solid Steel began as a radio show on Kiss FM hosted by Coldcut's Matt Black and Jonathan More, where they were not only able to play and mix records, but also display their cut-up technique live. The show was known for airing "The Broadest Beats in London"
They were joined by PC and Strictly Kev from DJ Food in 1993. The two-hour show was filled by improv, with each DJ taking sets of 30 minutes. In 1997, Darren Knott, otherwise known as DK, joined the show as producer, as Coldcut and DJ Food were increasingly away on tour.

They left Kiss FM in 1999 after playlist changes meant they would be consigned to the Tuesday 2am4am graveyard slot. The show was still recorded each week, being available online and syndicated worldwide. In 1999, they were offered a slot on the advertisement-free BBC's London Live radio station and were on the station until 2002. This unique 2-hour show has expanded to include guest mixes, regular video mixes (often the #1 video podcast on iTunes) and the additional 1-hour podcast highlights, regularly featuring in the top 10 music podcasts on iTunes, with over 3 million downloads to date and hosted on the Ninja Tune SoundCloud each week.

In 2012, Solid Steel joined Strongroom Alive internet radio to perform a weekly live show on Thursday nights (79pm). Other shows include Ross Allen, Clash + Dazed magazine. The show is hosted by Jon More (Coldcut), and he is often joined by DK, DJ Food and rolling guests.

Guest mixes and interviews have featured most of the Ninja Tune roster as well as many other artists and DJs including;

Four Tet, 
Skream, 
Norman Jay, 
Robot Koch, 
Goldie, 
Tim Healey, 
Company Flow, 
Jackmaster, 
Z-Trip, 
Steinski, 
Seiji, 
Pearson Sound, 
DJ Kentaro, 
Toddla T, 
Freestylers, 
Hudson Mohawke, 
DJ Marky, 
DJ Yoda, 
Diplo, 
Ben Westbeech, 
Cut Chemist, 
DJ Shadow, 
4 Hero, 
Andy Smith, 
Laurent Garnier, 
Kenny Dope, 
RJD2, 
Amorphous Androgynous, 
Alec Empire, 
The Orb, 
Robert Owens, 
Portico Quartet,
Kutmah,
Pinch,
Trevor Jackson, 
Machinedrum,
FaltyDL, 
De La Soul, 
Double Dee & Steinski,  
David Axelrod,  
Ken Nordine,  
Jean Jacques Perrey,  
Quannum Projects,  
Juan Atkins,  
Mr Scruff, 
Kid Koala, 
Bonobo, 
Daedelus, 
Luke Vibert, and 
Anti-Pop Consortium.

The first Solid Steel album was released by DJ Food and DK in 2001.

Solid Steel discography

Radio stations playing the Solid Steel show 
 Radio Solid Steel - Russia - http://solidsteel.tk/
 Radio Campus - France - http://www.radio-campus.org/
 Radio Active - Wellington, New Zealand - http://www.radioactive.co.nz/
 FSK Hamburg - Hamburg, Germany - http://www.fsk-hh.org/
 "The Move", XM Satellite Radio - United States - http://www.xmradio.com/
 UMFM 101.5 fm - Manitoba, Canada - http://www.umfm.com/
 FM4 - Austria - http://fm4.orf.at/
 Radio 3 Fach - Lucerne, Switzerland - http://www.3fach.ch/
 Resonance FM 104.4 FM - London, UK - http://www.resonancefm.com
 Juice 107.2 - Brighton, UK - http://www.juicebrighton.com/
 Radio B92 - Belgrade, Republic of Serbia - https://web.archive.org/web/20060906165913/http://www.b92.net/indexs.phtml
 106FM - Israel - https://www.webcitation.org/69ZKROjr5?url=http://www.106fm.co.il/
 Dinamo FM - Turkey - http://www.dinamo.fm/
 Radio Magnetic - Glasgow, Scotland - http://radiomagnetic.com/
 Triple J - Australia - http://www.abc.net.au/triplej/
 Radio National - Australia - http://www.abc.net.au/rn/
 3PBS - Melbourne, Australia - http://www.pbsfm.org.au/
 2SER - Sydney, Australia - http://www.2ser.com/
 95bfm - Auckland, New Zealand - http://www.95bfm.co.nz/

External links
Official Solid Steel site
Solid Steel SoundCloud
Ninja Tune
Amon Tobin's 'temporary' site
DJ Food's official site
Hexstatic's official site
The Herbaliser's official site
DJ Kentaro's official site
Mr Scruff's official site

Similar DJ series
 Back to Mine
 DJ-Kicks

DJ mix album series
Compilation album series
Ninja Tune